NGC 719 is a lenticular galaxy in the constellation Aries. It was first discovered, on 24 November 1861, by Heinrich d'Arrest.

Gallery

References

External links 
 

0719
Lenticular galaxies
Aries (constellation)